Breviperna is a genus of stiletto flies in the family Therevidae. There are at least two described species in Breviperna.

Species
These two species belong to the genus Breviperna:
 Breviperna milleri Irwin, 1977 c g
 Breviperna placida (Coquillett, 1894) i c g b
Data sources: i = ITIS, c = Catalogue of Life, g = GBIF, b = Bugguide.net

References

Further reading

 

Therevidae
Articles created by Qbugbot
Asiloidea genera